Cristoforo da Bologna was an Italian painter. He was active in Bologna, Modena, and Ferrara. He painted toward the close of the 14th and the beginning of the 15th century.

Sources

14th-century Italian painters
Italian male painters
15th-century Italian painters
Trecento painters
Painters from Bologna
Painters from Ferrara
Gothic painters
14th-century births
15th-century deaths